I Am Really Sorry (lit. "I'm Really Really Sorry") is a 1976 South Korean film directed by Mun Yeo-song. It is the 2nd movie in the "Really Really" series, the 1st being Never Forget Me (1976) which was released earlier that same year, and also starred Im Ye-jin and Lee Deok-hwa.

Synopsis
Jung-ah keeps close to her heart, the memory of a boy who was injured while saving her from a serious bicycle accident when she was 9 years old. Now teenagers, they are reunited when Jung-ah and her friends encounter a crisis. Tae-il, who has become a thug, saves her once again and remembers her too, but is wrongfully accused and sent to a detention center. Jung-ah realises that Tae-il had developed a deep scar and blindness in one eye due to the incident and thinks that he became a juvenile delinquent due to these circumstances. Feeling sorry and responsible, she resolves to repay him by helping him in his life. She later also discovers that the incident had caused even more serious and life-changing problems for him and his family. Tae-il has difficulty adjusting to his new life and following rules but with Jung-ah's persistent care, grows to stay out of trouble, respect himself and show concern for her. Gradually, the two become friends and develop a close relationship.

Cast
 Im Ye-jin as Hwang Jung-ah
 Lee Deok-hwa as Song Tae-il
 Kim Bok-sun
 Lee Gyeong-jae
 Go Wa-ra
 Park Hui-suk
 Jo Tae-yun
 Choi Chang-yol
 Jeong Tae-seon
 No Yeong-gyu

Bibliography

English

Korean

Notes

1976 films
1970s Korean-language films
1970s teen romance films
South Korean romantic drama films
1976 romantic drama films